The David Range is a mountain range  west of the Masson Range, which it parallels, in the Framnes Mountains of Antarctica.

It was discovered on 14 February 1931 by the British Australian New Zealand Antarctic Research Expedition under Douglas Mawson, who named it for Professor Sir T.W. Edgeworth David.

Features of the David Range

 Bypass Nunatak
 Gap Nunatak
 Hordern Gap
 Mount Coates
 Mount Hordern
 Mount Lawrence
 Mount Parsons
 Mount Tritoppen
 Mount Twintop
 Smith Peaks
 Sortindane Peaks

See also
 Simpson Ridge, a feature nearby Mount Twintop

Further reading 
 United States. Defense Mapping Agency. Hydrographic Center, Sailing Directions for Antarctica: Includes Islands South of Latitude 60°, P 293
 James P. Minard, United States. Antarctic Projects Office, Glaciology and Glacial Geology of Antarctica, P 19
 Damien Gildea, Mountaineering in Antarctica: complete guide: Travel guide
 B. A. Marmo, J. Dawson, Movement and structural features observed in ice masses, Framnes Mountains, Mac.Robertson Land, East Antarctica, Annals of Glaciology, Volume 23 1996, pp. 388–395, Cambridge University Press, 20 January 2017, DOI: https://doi.org/10.3189/S0260305500013689

External links 

 David Range on USGS website
 David Range on AADC website 
 David Range on SCAR website
 images of the David Range
 David Range area satellite image
 David Range area map

References 
 

Mountain ranges of Mac. Robertson Land